Speyeria nokomis, the nokomis fritillary, is a species of fritillary in the family of butterflies known as Nymphalidae. It is found in North America.

The MONA or Hodges number for Speyeria nokomis is 4453.

Subspecies
These nine subspecies belong to the species Speyeria nokomis:
 Speyeria nokomis apacheana (Skinner, 1918) i c g
 Speyeria nokomis caerulescens Holland, 1900 c g
 Speyeria nokomis carsonensis Austin in T. Emmel, 1998 i g
 Speyeria nokomis coerulescens (W. Holland, 1900) i g
 Speyeria nokomis nigrocaerulea (W. P. Cockerell & Cockerell, 1900) c g
 Speyeria nokomis nitocris (W. H. Edwards, 1874) i
 Speyeria nokomis nokomis (W. H. Edwards, 1862) i g
 Speyeria nokomis valesinoalba Reuss, 1926 c g
 Speyeria nokomis wenona Dos Passos & Grey, 1945 c g
Data sources: i = ITIS, c = Catalogue of Life, g = GBIF, b = Bugguide.net

References

Further reading

External links

 

Speyeria
Articles created by Qbugbot
Butterflies described in 1862